Metron may refer to:

 Metron (character), a character created by Jack Kirby for his Fourth World series in DC Comics
 Metron (skipper), a genus of butterflies in the grass skipper family
 Metron (Star Trek), a fictional species in Star Trek: The Original Series
 Metron Aviation, an air traffic flow management company
 Metron of Macedon, also known as Metron of Pydna, a general of Alexander the Great
 Metron S, a synonym for Iproheptine, an antihistamine
 Metron, a typeface for Prague Metro by Jiří Rathouský
 Metron, plural metra, a 3 or 4-syllable repeating section of a poetic metre, see Metre (poetry)
 Metron, an international journal of statistics founded in 1920 by Italian statistician Corrado Gini
 metron, in Heim theory, a (two-dimensional) quantum of (multidimensional) space, a unit of measure
 A trio of characters in the Heisei Ultraseven universe

See also
 Metreon (disambiguation)